Francesca Martini (born 31 August 1961 in Verona) is a Venetist politician. She is a member of Liga Veneta-Lega Nord.

She was first elected to the Chamber of Deputies in 2001, but she failed re-election five years later. In 2007, however, she replaced Flavio Tosi as Health regional minister of Veneto in Galan III Government.

In May 2008, after returning to the Chamber of Deputies, Martini was appointed Under-Secretary of Labour and Health in Berlusconi IV Cabinet.

References 

1961 births
Living people
Politicians of Veneto
Politicians from Verona
Lega Nord politicians
Venetist politicians
Deputies of Legislature XIV of Italy
Deputies of Legislature XVI of Italy
21st-century Italian women politicians
Women members of the Chamber of Deputies (Italy)